Elections to Tameside Council were held on 1 May 2008. One third of the council was up for election, with each successful candidate to serve a four-year term of office, expiring in 2012. The Labour Party retained overall control of the council.

After the election the composition of the council was:

Results

Ashton Hurst ward

Ashton St. Michael's ward

Ashton Waterloo ward

Audenshaw ward

Denton North East ward

Denton South ward

Denton West ward

Droylsden East ward

Droylsden West ward

Dukinfield ward

Dukinfield / Stalybridge ward
Dorothy Cartwright defected from the Conservative Party to the Labour Party in December 2010.

Hyde Godley ward

Hyde Newton ward

Hyde Werneth ward

Longdendale ward

Mossley ward

St. Peters ward

Stalybridge North ward

Stalybridge South ward

References

2008 English local elections
2008
2000s in Greater Manchester